The following is a list of top scorers of the Costa Rican Primera División, the top tier of the Costa Rican football pyramid.

References

Top scorer
Costa Rica